Vasiliki Tsavdaridou (born October 29, 1980) is a Greek artistic gymnast. She represented Greece at the 1996 Summer Olympics.

Eponymous skill
Tsavdaridou has one eponymous skill listed in the Code of Points.

References 

1980 births
Living people
Greek female artistic gymnasts
Gymnasts at the 1996 Summer Olympics
Olympic gymnasts of Greece
Originators of elements in artistic gymnastics
Gymnasts from Thessaloniki